Richard Maxwell Eaton (born 1940) is an American historian, currently working as a professor of history at the University of Arizona. He is known for having written the notable books on the history of India before 1800. He is also credited for his work on the social roles of Sufis, slavery, and cultural history of pre-modern India. His research is focused on the Deccan, the Bengal frontier, Islam in India and India in the Persianate Age: 1000-1765, a book with a focus on new cultural history of India from the middle ages to the arrival of the British.

Publications
Eaton has written and edited several books on India and related topics: 
Sufis of Bijapur, 1300-1700 -  Princeton University Preas : 1978
Islamic History as Global History - American Historical Association,: 1990
Firuzabad: Palace City of the Deccan -  Oxford University Press : 1992
The Rise of Islam and the Bengal Frontier, 1204-1760 -  Oxford University Press : 1993
Essays on Islam and Indian history -  Oxford University Press : 2000
A Social History of the Deccan, 1300-1761 0  Eight Indian Lives. Cambridge: Cambridge University Press, - published: 2000 (The New Cambridge History of India.  I.8,)
India's Islamic Traditions, 711-1750 (general editor). Oxford University Press: 2003
 Approaches to the Study of Conversion to Islam in India in Religious Movements in South Asia 600-1800 (edited by David N. Lorenzen) - Oxford University Press: 2005
Temple Desecration and Muslim States in Medieval India - published: 2004
 Slavery and South Asian History (co-editor with Indrani Chatterjee) - Indiana University Press: 2006, 
Power, Memory, Architecture: Contested Sites on India's Deccan Plateau, 1300-1600 - Oxford University Press: 2014
India in the Persianate Age: 1000-1765 - University of California Press; Penguin: 2019
co-ed. with Ramya Sreenivasan. The Oxford Handbook of the Mughal World. 2020. (in process,   DOI:10.1093/oxfordhb/9780190222642.001.0001

References

External links
Richard M Eaton at University of Arizona

20th-century American educators
People from Grand Rapids, Michigan
Living people
20th-century American historians
American male non-fiction writers
1940 births
20th-century American writers
20th-century American male writers
Historians from Michigan